The 1970 Georgia gubernatorial election was held on November 3, 1970. It was marked by the election as Governor of Georgia of the relatively little-known former state senator Jimmy Carter after a hard battle in the Democratic primary. This election is famous because Carter, who was often regarded as one of the New South Governors, later ran for president in 1976 on his gubernatorial record and won. , this was the last time Fulton County was carried by the Republican candidate in a gubernatorial election, the only time it failed to back Carter, and the last time a Democrat in any race won without carrying it.

Background
Under the Georgia constitution of 1945, incumbent Democratic governor Lester Maddox was prohibited from seeking re-election.

Democratic primary

Candidates
Jimmy Carter, former State Senator from Plains
Thomas J. Irwin
McKee Hargett
Chevene Bowers King, founder of the Albany Movement and candidate for State Representative in 1964
Adam B. Matthews
Carl E. Sanders, former Governor (1963–67)
J. B. Stoner, white supremacist

Campaign
Initially the strongest candidate was former governor Carl E. Sanders. Sanders was a moderate, who worked to improve education, the environment and led the transition away from racial segregation with cooperation with the United States Federal Government. He left office at the peak of his popularity.

His main opponent was former state senator and candidate for the gubernatorial nomination in 1966 Jimmy Carter.

Democratic primary election results

Runoff
A runoff was held on September 23. Despite Sanders's initial front-runner status and popularity, Carter won by nearly 20 points.

Lieutenant governor
Governor Maddox ran for lieutenant governor and won the nomination. Although Maddox was elected as a Democratic candidate at the same time as Jimmy Carter's election as governor as a Democratic candidate, the two were not running mates; in Georgia, particularly in that era of Democratic dominance, the winners of the primary elections went on to easy victories in the general elections without campaigning together as an official ticket or as running mates.

Republican primary

Candidates
James L. Bentley, Comptroller of Georgia since 1963
Hal Suit, TV news presenter

Campaign
At this time, Georgia was still regarded as a part of the Democratic Party's Solid South, despite the Republican plurality in the 1966 gubernatorial race. The Democratic position in 1970 was again regarded as safe. TV newsman Hal Suit faced Comptroller James L. Bentley, who had been elected as a Democrat but joined the Republican party in 1968.

Republican primary

General election
Carter ran on a populist platform. While he refused to join the segregationist White Citizens' Council, he ran a campaign specifically designed to win over the segregationist vote that had made Maddox governor four years earlier. In winning the governorship back in 1970, he courted the right wing, particularly the large constituency of Lester Maddox, the fiery segregationist Governor ... At one point, he called Mr. Maddox "the essence of the Democratic Party" and added that he was "proud" to be on the ticket with him..  Carter's true feelings about race might be better indicated by the fact that his had been one of only two families which voted to admit blacks to the Plains Baptist Church, but that was not something advertised in the 1970 race for governor.

Results
Carter won the governorship easily.

Controversy

Civil rights 
Prior to this campaign, Jimmy Carter appeared to be a proponent of civil rights and desegregation. In 1954 he refused to join the White Citizens Council despite immense pressure and went on to vote against segregation for his church in 1965. However, after failing to run as a moderate in the Georgia Gubernatorial Election of 1966, Carter's new strategy in 1970 was designed to attract the pro-segregationist vote. Poll data suggested that the appearance of a pro-segregationist position could be critical to winning the race, even if it was never overtly stated.  In order to shore up segregationist support, Carter made overtures to numerous racial organizations, and even personally called the cofounder of the White Citizens Council. Carter's apparent support for segregation sparked animosity with his opponent Carl Sanders. Sanders claims that when his own campaign had presented the same poll data, he refused to pursue a strategy on it for moral reasons. Furthermore, Carter's campaign printed numerous pamphlets insinuating Sanders was too "chummy" with blacks.

Ultimately, Carter himself has expressed embarrassment and regret over his strategy. After being elected, he reversed his position on segregation prominently, stating in his 1971 gubernatorial inaugural address "The time for racial discrimination is over." Though attendees could be heard booing, this declaration was hardly controversial even for a Southern governor, as many had already made similar statements by that time.

Carter won praise for his strategy from Leroy Johnson, who stated "I understand why he ran that kind of ultra-conservative campaign. You have to do that to win. And that is the main thing. I don't believe you can win [Georgia] without being a racist."

References

Gubernatorial
1970
Georgia
November 1970 events in the United States
Jimmy Carter